Evan Maureen Ryan (born April 18, 1971) is an American public servant currently serving as White House Cabinet Secretary in the administration of Joe Biden.  She previously served as Assistant Secretary of State for Educational and Cultural Affairs (ECA) in the Obama Administration (2013–2017) and was assistant for intergovernmental affairs and public liaison for then-Vice President Joe Biden.

Early life and education 
Ryan was born in 1971 in Alexandria, Virginia, where she grew up in a middle-class family of Irish Catholic descent. She received Bachelor of Arts (BA) in political science from Boston College. In May 2006, she received her Masters in International Public Policy from Johns Hopkins University’s School of Advanced International Studies.

Career 
Ryan served under Secretary of State John Kerry as Assistant Secretary of State for Educational and Cultural Affairs and worked in the Obama-Biden White House as Assistant to the Vice President and Special Assistant to the President for Intergovernmental Affairs and Public Engagement from September 2013 to January 2017.

Prior to joining the Obama Administration, Ryan served as Deputy Campaign Manager for then Senator Biden's 2008 presidential campaign and also served on the Kerry's 2004 Presidential Campaign and Hillary Clinton's 2000 senatorial campaign. Ryan served in the Clinton White House, as Deputy Director of Scheduling for First Lady Hillary Clinton and as Special Assistant to the First Lady's Chief of Staff.

After leaving the White House in January 2017, she helped launch and lead Axios, and served as its Executive Vice President.  She has worked as a consultant for the Education Partnership for Children of Conflict and served as Deputy Chair for the governance track of the Clinton Global Initiative. She is currently a member of the Council on Foreign Relations.

She was a Senior Advisor for the Biden-Harris transition team. In January 2021, she was appointed White House Cabinet Secretary.

Personal life 
In 2002, Antony Blinken and Evan Ryan were married in an interfaith ceremony officiated by a rabbi and a priest at Holy Trinity Catholic Church in Washington, D.C.
 Blinken, who served as Deputy Secretary of State under John Kerry in the Obama administration, now serves as Secretary of State under President Biden. They have two children, including Lila Ryan Blinken, who was born on February 26, 2020.

References

External links
Profile at WhiteHouse.gov
Wedding announcement, The New York Times, March 3, 2002

|-

1971 births
21st-century American women
American people of Irish descent
American political women
American women diplomats
American diplomats
Assistant Secretaries of State for Education and Culture
Biden administration personnel
Blinken family
Morrissey College of Arts & Sciences alumni
Catholics from Virginia
Georgetown Visitation Preparatory School alumni
Johns Hopkins University alumni
Living people
Obama administration personnel
People from Alexandria, Virginia
Virginia Democrats